Ogden Hoffman (October 13, 1794 – May 1, 1856) was an American lawyer and politician who served two terms in the United States House of Representatives.

Life
Ogden Hoffman was born on October 13, 1794, the son of New York Attorney General Josiah Ogden Hoffman (1766–1837) and Mary (Colden) Hoffman. He pursued classical studies and graduated from Columbia College in 1812.

Career
He served for three years in the Navy and was warranted a midshipman in 1814.  He took part in the War of 1812 and the Second Barbary War as a crew member on the USS President, and was taken prisoner when the President was captured in 1814.

After leaving the Navy he studied law under his father, was admitted to the bar in 1818, and commenced practice in Goshen, New York.

Political career
Hoffman was District Attorney of Orange County from May 1823 to January 1826, and a member of the New York State Assembly (Orange Co.) in 1826. He then returned to New York City and there practiced law in partnership with Hugh Maxwell, who was New York County District Attorney.

Hoffman was again a member of the New York State Assembly (New York Co.) in 1828; and was New York County District Attorney from 1829 to 1835.

He disagreed with the Jackson administration over the need for a federally chartered central bank, and abandoned Tammany Hall and the Democratic Party for the Whigs after Jackson's decision not to re-charter the Second Bank of the United States.

In 1836, Hoffman defended Richard P. Robinson at his trial for the murder of Helen Jewett and got his client acquitted.

Hoffman was elected as a Whig to the 25th and 26th United States Congresses, holding office from March 4, 1837, to March 3, 1841. He was United States Attorney for the Southern District of New York from 1841 to 1845; and was New York Attorney General from 1854 to 1855, elected on the Whig ticket at the New York state election, 1853.

Personal life
On June 27, 1819, he married Emily Burrall, daughter of Charles Burrall. Together, they had two children:

 Charles Burrall Hoffman (1821–1892), who married Harriet Bronson Willett, granddaughter of Dr. Isaac Bronson.
 Ogden Hoffman, Jr. (1822–1891), who served as a federal judge in California for more than 40 years.

In November 1838, he married Virginia Southard (d. 1886), daughter of Samuel Lewis Southard, who was a U.S. Senator, Secretary of the Navy, and the tenth Governor of New Jersey. Together, they had three children:

 Samuel Southard Hoffman (b. 1839), who married Sarah Acklen
 Mary Colden Hoffman (b. 1840)
 Virginia Southard Hoffman (b. 1842)

He died on May 1, 1856, at his home on Ninth Street in New York City, of "congestion of the lungs."  He was buried at St. Mark's Church in-the-Bowery.

References
Notes

Sources
 
 The New-York Civil List compiled by Franklin Benjamin Hough (pages 35, 253, 257, 353 and 431; 1863)
 Death of the Hon. Ogden Hoffman in the New York Times on May 2, 1856
 Genealogy of the Hoffman Family by (Dodd, Mead & Co., NYC; pg. 279ff)

1793 births
1856 deaths
Columbia College (New York) alumni
United States Navy sailors
Members of the New York State Assembly
New York State Attorneys General
United States Attorneys for the Southern District of New York
New York County District Attorneys
New York (state) Democrats
Ogden
Whig Party members of the United States House of Representatives from New York (state)
19th-century American politicians
People from Goshen, New York
Deaths from pulmonary edema
Presidents of the Saint Nicholas Society of the City of New York